Ojima may refer to:

Ojima (surname), a Japanese surname
Ojima, Gunma, a town merged into the city of Ōta, Gunma Prefecture, Japan
Ojima Station, a railway station in Kōtō, Tokyo, Japan
Higashi-ojima Station, a railway station in Kōtō, Tokyo, Japan
Nishi-ojima Station, a railway station in Kōtō, Tokyo, Japan
Ojima Domain, also known as Kojima Domain, a Japanese domain of the Edo period
Ojima River, a tributary of Turgeon Lake in Quebec, Canada
Rivière-Ojima, Quebec, an unorganized territory of RCM Abitibi-Ouest, in Quebec, Canada
Ou Island, an island in Okinawa, Japan

See also
Ojima lactam, an organic compound of some importance in the commercial production of Taxol